The 15233 / 15234 Maithili Express is Express type train of Indian Railways connecting Kolkata with Darbhanga. It covers a distance of 539 kilometers at an average speed of 49 kmph. It has general, AC two tier, AC three tier, and sleeper classes.  All classes except general require reservations. There is no pantry car, although tatkal scheme is available. It is hauled by WAM-4, WAP-4 and WDM-3A classes of locomotives.

Route and halts

Traction

Rake sharing
The train shares its rake with 15235/15236 Howrah–Darbhanga Express.

Timings
 15233 Maithili Express departs Kolkata station at 10:40 on Monday, Thursday and reaches Darbhanga at 22:15 same day.
 15234 Maithili Express departs Darbhanga at 16:10 on Sunday, Wednesday and reaches Kolkata station at 3:10 next day.

Timetable
15233 - Chitpur (Kolkata) to Darbhanga

15234 - Darbhanga to Chitpur (Kolkata)

References
http://indiarailinfo.com/train/8920?kkk=1315119719141

Transport in Kolkata
Transport in Darbhanga
Named passenger trains of India
Rail transport in West Bengal
Rail transport in Jharkhand
Rail transport in Bihar
Express trains in India